Kakuchuya Creek, historically called the Kakuchuya River, is a stream in Cassiar Country of British Columbia, Canada, flowing northwest from its source in the Level Mountain Range into the Dudidontu River. It contains a series of small lakes.

References

Rivers of British Columbia
Level Mountain
Nahlin Plateau